Ray Samalonis (born January 31, 1968) is an American professional wrestler, better known by his ring name "Surfer" Ray Odyssey.

Professional wrestling career 
Odyssey competes primarily in Northeastern and Mid-Atlantic independent promotions. Odyssey has had successful stints in Mid-South Wrestling, American Wrestling Association, International World Class Championship Wrestling, Extreme Championship Wrestling and the National Wrestling Alliance during the late 1980s and throughout the 1990s and he also made a brief television appearance in the World Wrestling Federation and defeated Tazz in a dark match in 1991.

In addition to wrestling as a singles competitor, Odyssey also formed several successful tag teams with partners such as Vic Steamboat, Chris Evans and most notably with The Inferno Kid (as "The Beach Bullies") and Jimmy Deo (as "Surf and Turf").

Championships and accomplishments 
Can-Am Wrestling
Can-Am Light Heavyweight Championship (1 time)
Century Wrestling Alliance
CWA Light Heavyweight Championship (2 times)
CWA Tag Team Championship (1 time) – with Vic Steamboat
International World Class Championship Wrestling
IWCCW Light Heavyweight Championship (1 time)
National Wrestling Alliance
NWA United States Tag Team Championship (1 time) – with The Inferno Kid
NWA Northeast Wrestling
NWA Northeast Light Heavyweight Championship (1 time)
Pennsylvania Championship Wrestling
PCW United States Heavyweight Championship (1 time) Defeated Kane 
PCW Tag Team Championship (1 time) – with Jimmy Deo
Pro Wrestling Illustrated
PWI ranked him # 170 of the 500 best singles wrestlers of the PWI 500 in 1992
World Wrestling Association
WWA Junior Heavyweight Championship (3 times)

References

External links 
 

1968 births
American male professional wrestlers
Living people
Professional wrestlers from California
20th-century professional wrestlers
21st-century professional wrestlers
ICW/IWCCW Light Heavyweight Champions